The 1861 United States Senate special election in Pennsylvania was held on March 14, 1861. David Wilmot was elected by the Pennsylvania General Assembly to the United States Senate.

Background
The Republican Simon Cameron was elected to the United States Senate by the General Assembly, consisting of the House of Representatives and the Senate, in January 1857. Sen. Cameron resigned on March 4, 1861, to become United States Secretary of War in the Abraham Lincoln administration, vacating the seat.

Results
Following the resignation of Sen. Simon Cameron, the Pennsylvania General Assembly convened on March 14, 1861, to elect a new Senator to fill the vacancy. The results of the vote of both houses combined are as follows:

|-
|-bgcolor="#EEEEEE"
| colspan="3" align="right" | Totals
| align="right" | 133
| align="right" | 100.00%
|}

See also 
 United States Senate elections, 1860 and 1861
 United States Senate election in Pennsylvania, 1861

References

External links
Pennsylvania Election Statistics: 1682-2006 from the Wilkes University Election Statistics Project.

1861, special
Pennsylvania 1861
Pennsylvania
United States Senate 1861
March 1861 events
1861 Pennsylvania elections
Pennsylvania 1861